Joseph Candolfi  (15 July 1922 – 7 August 2011) was a Swiss Prelate of the Catholic Church.  

Joseph Candolfi was born in Reconvilier, Switzerland and ordained a priest on 1 July 1947. Candolfi was appointed bishop to the Diocese of Basel as well as Titular Bishop of Frequentium on 1 June 1983 and consecrated on 29 June 1983. Candolfi retired on 30 March 1996 as Auxiliary bishop.

See also
Diocese of Basel

References

External links
Catholic-Hierarchy 
Diocese of Basel (German)

20th-century Roman Catholic bishops in Switzerland
21st-century Roman Catholic bishops in Switzerland
1922 births
2011 deaths